is a Japanese football player who plays for Iwate Grulla Morioka in J3 League.

Mizuno began his professional career with JEF United Chiba, with whom he won the J.League Cup in 2005 and 2006; he was named most valuable player of the 2006 competition. His other former clubs include Ventforet Kofu, Kashiwa Reysol, and Scottish side Celtic.

Mizuno has 4 caps for the Japan national team, including two appearances as a substitute at the 2007 Asian Cup. As a youth, Mizuno also appeared in the 2005 World Youth Championship as a member of the Japanese Under-20 team, scoring one goal.

He is the cousin of Keita Suzuki, also a footballer.

Club career

JEF United Chiba
After graduating from Shimizu Commercial High School, Mizuno joined JEF United Ichihara (later JEF United Chiba) in 2004. He was the MVP of the 2006 J.League Cup competition.

Celtic
Celtic's interest was confirmed by chief executive Peter Lawwell in January 2008 who explained that the club planned on signing Mizuno, if he was granted a work permit.

After initially being denied a permit, Gordon Strachan took part in an appeal hearing in which he described his other Japanese import Shunsuke Nakamura as a "flawless performer" and "The best player I have ever worked with, and that includes [Kenny] Dalglish and [Gary] McAllister", and claimed that Mizuno was a young player of immense talent and potential. The appeal was successful and Celtic completed the signing of Koki Mizuno on 29 January 2008. On 18 July 2008, Mizuno made his debut in a 2–0 pre-season friendly win over Southampton. On 8 November, he made his league debut for Celtic in a 2–0 victory over Motherwell, replacing Scott McDonald in the 88th minute and, on 21 December 2008, he made his first start in a game against Falkirk. He scored his first goal for Celtic in the 90th minute of the match, assisted by a pass from Shunsuke Nakamura. On 1 July 2010, Mizuno was released by Celtic.

Kashiwa Reysol
In the summer of 2010, Mizuno signed for J2 League side Kashiwa Reysol. In his first game for Kashiwa, he suffered a knee ligament injury which sidelined him for the rest of the 2010 season.

International career
Mizuno was a member of the Japan team for 2005 World Youth Championship where he scored a goal against Benin. His first cap as a full international came when he substituted Naohiro Takahara on 24 March 2007 in a friendly against Peru. He was a member of the Japan team for 2007 Asian Cup and played two games as a substitute.

Club statistics
Updated to 23 February 2017.

National team statistics

Honours
JEF United Chiba
J.League Cup Champions: 2005, 2006

Celtic
Scottish Premier League Runner-up: 2008–09, 2009–10

Individual
J.League Cup MVP: 2006

References

External links

 
 Japan National Football Team Database
 
 
 

1985 births
Living people
Association football people from Shizuoka Prefecture
Japanese footballers
Japan youth international footballers
Japan international footballers
J1 League players
J2 League players
J3 League players
JEF United Chiba players
Kashiwa Reysol players
Ventforet Kofu players
Vegalta Sendai players
Sagan Tosu players
Roasso Kumamoto players
SC Sagamihara players
Iwate Grulla Morioka players
Scottish Premier League players
Celtic F.C. players
Japanese expatriate footballers
Expatriate footballers in Scotland
Japanese expatriate sportspeople in Scotland
2007 AFC Asian Cup players
Association football wingers